Sohaila Sharifi
came to serve to represent Ghazni Province in Afghanistan's Meshrano Jirga, the upper house of its National Legislature, in 2005.
She is a member of the Qizilbash ethnic group
She was a refugee in Iran for fifteen years,
where she ran a non-governmental organization
called the Afghan Refugee Association.

References

21st-century Afghan women politicians
21st-century Afghan politicians
Politicians of Ghazni Province
Living people
Members of the House of Elders (Afghanistan)
Year of birth missing (living people)